Contacyphon padi is a species of marsh beetle in the family Scirtidae. It is found in Europe and Northern Asia (excluding China).

References

Further reading

 
 
 

Scirtoidea
Articles created by Qbugbot
Beetles described in 1758
Taxa named by Carl Linnaeus